Wentzel and Wentzell are surnames, and may refer to:

Wentzel 
 Emil Wentzel (c. 1817–1892), timber merchant and politician in South Australia
 Gregor Wentzel (1898–1978), German physicist
 Stan Wentzel (1917–1991), Major League Baseball player 
 Sune Wentzel (born 1971), Norwegian frisbeer
 Volkmar Wentzel (1915–2006), American photographer

Wentzel may also refer to:
 Wentzel–Kramers–Brillouin approximation

Wentzell 
 Alexander D. Wentzell (born 1937), Russian-American mathematician
 Fritz Wentzell (1899–1948), highly decorated German military leader during World War II

Wentzell may also refer to:
 Freidlin–Wentzell theorem, a statistics tool relating to Brownian motion

German-language surnames
Surnames from given names